John Boylen (29 March 1898 – 5 November 1961) was a Scottish footballer who made 64 appearances in the Football League playing for Lincoln City, Wigan Borough and Grimsby Town. He played as an outside right. He also played in the Scottish League for Armadale.

References

1898 births
1961 deaths
Sportspeople from Wishaw
Scottish footballers
Association football forwards
Lincoln City F.C. players
Wigan Borough F.C. players
Grimsby Town F.C. players
Armadale F.C. players
Kettering Town F.C. players
English Football League players
Scottish Football League players
Place of death missing
Footballers from North Lanarkshire